Island Walk is an unincorporated area and a census-designated place (CDP) in Collier County, Florida, United States. As of the 2020 United States census, there were 2,812 people, 1,511 households and 1,085 families residing in the CDP.  The population was 3,035 at the 2010 census. It is part of the Naples–Marco Island Metropolitan Statistical Area.

Geography

There are extensive ponds that surround almost every street in the community.

Demographics

2020 census

References

External links
Island Walk official website

Census-designated places in Collier County, Florida
Census-designated places in Florida